Edmund Butler, 2nd Viscount Mountgarret (c. 1562 – 1602), was the son of Richard Butler, 1st Viscount Mountgarret and Eleanor Butler.

Marriage and Children
He married Grany, Grania, or Grizzel FitzPatrick, daughter of Barnaby Fitzpatrick, 1st Baron Upper Ossory.

Among their children were:
 Richard Butler, 3rd Viscount Mountgarret (1578 - 1651) 
 Helen Butler, who married her second cousin, Walter Butler, 11th Earl of Ormond
 Anne Butler, who married Edward Butler, 1st Viscount Galmoye
 Margaret Butler, who married Oliver Grace of Carney, County Tipperary 

His sister Eleanor married Thomas Butler, 4th Baron Cahir.

See also
Butler dynasty

References

Bibliography

1560s births
1602 deaths
Edmund
Viscounts in the Peerage of Ireland
Butler
16th-century Irish people